A lemon drop is a sugar coated, lemon-flavored candy that is typically colored yellow and often shaped like a lemon.  They can be sweet or have a more sour flavor. Lemon drops are made by boiling sugar, water and cream of tartar until it reaches the hard crack stage. As the mixture cools, lemon flavor is added. The candy is then rolled into long ropes, cut into small pieces and rolled in sugar. Lemon drops originated in England, where confectioners learned that adding acid such as lemon juice to the boiled sugar mixture prevented sugar from crystallizing.

The term "lemon drop" is also occasionally applied to lemon-flavored throat lozenges, and an alcoholic drink consisting of lemon juice, vodka and sugar.

A forerunner of the lemon drop is the Salem Gibraltar, and created in 1806. Modern lemon drops, like most hard candies we know today, descend from ancient medicinal lozenges. 18th century advances in sugar technology made hard sugar concoctions possible.

See also
 Lemon drop – a vodka-based cocktail
 Sherbet lemon
 Lemonhead (candy)

References

Candy
Lemon dishes
Throat lozenges
American confectionery